is a passenger railway station located in the town of Misaki, Kume District, Okayama Prefecture, Japan, operated by West Japan Railway Company (JR West).

Lines

Station layout
The station consists of two opposed ground-level side platforms connected by a footbridge. The wooden station building is located adjacent to Platform 1, which is the main platform and serves trains in both directions. The station is staffed. The octagonal station building as a turtle motif, with a turtle head installed on the roof, and clocks in the place of eyes. In addition to the waiting room, there are restaurants and a library in the station building.

Platforms

Adjacent stations

History
Kamenokō Station opened on December 21, 1898.  With the privatization of the Japan National Railways (JNR) on April 1, 1987, the station came under the aegis of the West Japan Railway Company The current station building was completed in 1995.

Passenger statistics
In fiscal 2019, the station was used by an average of 224 passengers daily..

Surrounding area
Misaki Town Hall
 Japan National Route 53.

See also
List of railway stations in Japan

References

External links

 Kamenokō Station Official Site

Railway stations in Okayama Prefecture
Tsuyama Line
Railway stations in Japan opened in 1898